Blank or Blanks may refer to:
Blank (archaeology), a thick, shaped stone biface for refining into a stone tool
Blank (cartridge), a type of gun cartridge
Blank (Scrabble), a playing piece in the board game Scrabble 
Blank (solution), a solution containing no analyte
A planchet or blank, a round metal disk to be struck as a coin
Application blank, a space provided for data on a form
Glass blank, an unfinished piece of glass
Key blank, an uncut key
About:blank, a Web browser function
Blank (playing card), playing card in card-point games

Created works 
"Blank" (Eyehategod song), a track on the album Take as Needed for Pain
Blank (2009 film), a French drama film
Blank (2019 film), an Indian action thriller film
The Blanks, an American a cappella group
"Blank!", a 1957 short story by Isaac Asimov
[BLANK], a 2019 play by Alice Birch

Names 
Blank (horse), a Thoroughbred racehorse and sire
Blank (surname)

Blanks
Blanks, Louisiana, an unincorporated community in the United States
Blanks (musician), Dutch musician and Youtuber
Ernests Blanks (1894–1972), Latvian publicist
Jim Blanks (born 1952), American basketball player

See also
 Blanking (disambiguation)
 Blank page (disambiguation)
 Blank space (disambiguation)